Theme Music from "The James Dean Story" is a 1956 soundtrack album to the James Dean biopic, The James Dean Story composed by Leith Stevens and featuring trumpeter Chet Baker and saxophonist Bud Shank.

Reception

Lindsay Planer of Allmusic states, "the vast majority of the material is little more than ersatz-cool filler, bearing little distinction. From an historical perspective this seems almost criminal, especially in light of the inordinate talent corralled for the project".

Track listing
All compositions by Leith Stevens except as indicated
 "Jimmy's Theme" - 2:52
 "The Search" - 4:43
 "Lost Love" - 3:39
 "People" - 3:35
 "The Movie Star" - 3:36
 "Fairmont, Indiana" - 4:34
 "Rebel at Work" - 3:44
 "Success and Then What" - 3:58
 "Let Me Be Loved" (Ray Evans, Jay Livingston) - 4:11
 "Hollywood" - 5:06
 "Let Me Be Loved" [Vocal Version] (Evans, Livingston) - 2:14

Personnel
Chet Baker — trumpet
Bud Shank — alto saxophone, flute
Don Fagerquist, Ray Linn - trumpet  (tracks 1, 2, 4-6 & 8-11) 
Milt Bernhart - trombone  (tracks 1, 2 & 4-11) 
Charlie Mariano, Richie Steward - alto saxophone  (tracks 1, 2, 4-6 & 8-11) 
Bill Holman, Richie Kamuca - tenor saxophone  (tracks 1, 2, 4-6 & 8-11) 
Pepper Adams - baritone saxophone  (tracks 1, 2, 4-6 & 8-11) 
Claude Williamson - piano (tracks 1-6 & 8-11)
Monty Budwig - bass (tracks 1-6 & 8-11)
Mel Lewis - drums
Mike Pacheco - bongos  (tracks 1, 2, 4-6 & 8-11)

References 

1957 soundtrack albums
Bud Shank albums
Chet Baker albums
Pacific Jazz Records albums